Gelyard (also Romanized as Gelīyerd; also known as Gelerd) is a village in Siyahrud Rural District, in the Central District of Juybar County, Mazandaran Province, Iran. At the 2006 census, its population was 1,453, in 419 families.

References 

Populated places in Juybar County